, known as  after her second accession to the throne, was the 46th (with the name Empress Kōken) and the 48th monarch of Japan (with the name Empress Shōtoku), according to the traditional order of succession.

The daughter of Emperor Shōmu, Empress Kōken succeeded to the throne at the age of 31, following her father's renunciation. She first reigned from 749 to 758. During this period, the government was heavily influenced by her mother, the former empress consort Kōmyō, and the latter's nephew, Fujiwara no Nakamaro. She was eventually replaced on the throne by her relative, Emperor Junnin, whose rule was a continuation of Nakamaro's regime. During the intermediate period of her reigns, the retired empress Kōken is said to have become close to a monk without a noble background, named Dōkyō, by 762. Their precise relationship remains a mystery, although there is a common version that it was romantic. The retired empress had taken Buddhist oaths and became a nun, but retained a decisive role in politics. After Kōmyō's death in July 760, the growing power struggle between Kōken's and Nakamaro's opposing factions became increasingly inevitable. Following the suppression of the Fujiwara no Nakamaro Rebellion and his murder, Kōken reascended the throne as Empress Shōtoku in 764 and ruled until her death in 770, concentrating the government into her own hands. Dōkyō was appointed Grand Minister within a year. In 766, he was promoted to Hōō (priestly emperor) and in around 769 tried to ascend the throne himself, which led to a scandal; this was one of few recorded instances when there was an attempt to end the Yamato dynasty. The death of the empress, presumably from smallpox, and resistance from the aristocracy destroyed his plans. This incident was a reason for the later move of the Japanese capital from Nara (Heijō). Empress Kōken was one of the most politically powerful women in Japanese history: subsequent empresses were only ritual rulers, while the government was dominated by the shoguns (military dictators).

In the history of Japan, Kōken/Shōtoku was the sixth of eight women to take on the role of empress regnant. The five female monarchs before her were Suiko, Kōgyoku/Saimei, Jitō, Genmei and Genshō, and the two women sovereigns reigning after Kōken/Shōtoku were Meishō and Go-Sakuramachi.

Traditional narrative
Her father was Emperor Shōmu, and her mother was Empress Kōmyō.

Kōken is traditionally venerated at her tomb; the Imperial Household Agency designates , in Nara, Nara, as the location of Kōken's mausoleum. The site is publicly accessible.

Events of Kōken's life
 August 19, 749: In the 25th year of Shōmu-tennōs reign (聖武天皇二十五年), the emperor renounced his throne and the succession (senso) was received by his daughter. Shortly thereafter, Kōken is said to have acceded to the throne.
 757: Conspiracy to overthrow Empress Kōken was not successful.
 758: Kōken abdicated in favor of a cousin who would become known as Emperor Junnin. The Empress had reigned for about ten years.
 764: In the sixth year of Junnin-tennōs reign, the emperor was deposed by his adoptive mother, and the succession was received by former-Empress Kōken.
 January 26, 765:  Kōken formally reascended the throne (sokui) as Empress Shōtoku.
 August 28, 770 (: Empress Shōtoku died at age 57, leaving the throne vacant.  She was succeeded by her first cousin twice removed, Emperor Kōnin.  Empress Shōtoku had reigned for five years.

Eras of her reigns
The years of Kōken's reign are more specifically identified by more than one era name.
 Tenpyō-kanpō  (749)
 Tenpyō-shōhō (749–757)
 Tenpyō-hōji  (757–765)

The years of Shōtoku's reign are more specifically identified by more than one era name.
 Tenpyō-hōji  (757–765)
 Tenpyō-jingo (765–767)
 Jingo-keiun  (767–770)

Legacy
Koken's reign was turbulent, and she survived coup attempts by both Tachibana no Naramaro and Fujiwara no Nakamaro.  Today, she is remembered chiefly for her alleged affair with a Buddhist monk named Dōkyō (道鏡), a man she honored with titles and power. An oracle from Usa Shrine, the shrine of the kami  in Usa, is said to have proclaimed that the monk should be made emperor; but when the empress sent  to verify the pronouncement, Hachiman decreed that only one of imperial blood should ascend to the throne.

As with the seven other reigning empresses whose successors were most often selected from amongst the males of the paternal imperial bloodline, she was followed on the throne by a male cousin, which is why some conservative scholars argue that the women's reigns were temporary and that male-only succession tradition must be maintained in the 21st century.  Empress Genmei, who was followed on the  throne by her daughter, Empress Genshō, remains the sole exception to this conventional argument.

She is also known for sponsoring the Hyakumantō Darani, one of the largest productions of printed works in early Japan.

Otagi Nenbutsu-ji, a Buddhist temple in the Arashiyama neighborhood of Kyoto, was founded by Shōtoku in the middle of the eighth century.

Kugyō
 is a collective term for the very few most powerful men attached to the court of the Emperor of Japan in pre-Meiji eras.

In general, this elite group included only three to four men at a time. These were hereditary courtiers whose experience and background would have brought them to the pinnacle of a life's career. During Kōken's reign, this apex of the  Daijō-kan included:
 Taihō, Emi no Oshikatsu (formerly Fujiwara no Nakamaro).
 Daijō-daijin
 Sadaijin, Tachibana no Moroe (formerly Katsuragi-ō, Prince Katsuragi) (half brother of Empress Kōmyō).
 Udaijin, Fujiwara no Toyonari (first son of Fujiwara no Muchimaro).
 Udaijin, Fujiwara no Nakamaro (second son of Fujiwara no Muchimaro).
 Naidaijin
 Dainagon

The kugyō during Shōtoku's reign included:
 Daijō-daiji, Dōkyō.
 Sadaijin
 Udaijin, Kibi Makibi.
 Nadaijin
 Dainagon, Fujiwara Matate.

Genealogy 
Empress Kōken, known as Imperial Princess Abe (阿倍内親王), was the second daughter of Emperor Shōmu born by his empress consort, Fujiwara Asukabehime. She had a younger brother, but he didn't survive to adulthood.

Empress Kōken never married or had children.

Ancestry

See also
 Empress of Japan
 Emperor of Japan
 List of emperors of Japan
 Hyakumantō Darani

Notes

References
 
 
 Ponsonby-Fane, Richard Arthur Brabazon. (1959).  The Imperial House of Japan. Kyoto: Ponsonby Memorial Society. 
 Titsingh, Isaac. (1834). Nihon Ōdai Ichiran; ou,  Annales des empereurs du Japon.  Paris: Royal Asiatic Society, Oriental Translation Fund of Great Britain and Ireland. 
 Varley, H. Paul. (1980).  Jinnō Shōtōki: A Chronicle of Gods and Sovereigns. New York: Columbia University Press. ; 

 
 

 
 

 Women rulers in Japan
Deaths from smallpox
718 births
770 deaths
Infectious disease deaths in Japan
Japanese empresses regnant
People of Nara-period Japan
8th-century women rulers
8th-century Japanese monarchs
Japanese retired emperors
Japanese princesses
Daughters of emperors